The Clear Fork is a tributary of the Guyandotte River,  long, in southern West Virginia in the United States. The Clear Fork flows for its entire length in Wyoming County; its tributary the Laurel Fork also drains a small area of western Raleigh County.

It flows into the Guyandotte River from the east, to the southeast of the community of Simon in the R.D. Bailey Lake Wildlife Management Area. The stream is paralleled by West Virginia Route 85 between Toney Fork and Oceana; by West Virginia Route 10 from Oceana to north of Lillyhaven; and by West Virginia Route 971 between the Lillyhaven vicinity and Clear Fork.

See also
List of rivers of West Virginia

References 

Rivers of West Virginia
Tributaries of the Guyandotte River
Rivers of Wyoming County, West Virginia